Asif Khan (born 15 February 1990) is a Pakistani cricketer who now plays in the United Arab Emirates. Between 2007 and 2014, Asif played domestic cricket in Pakistan, including 32 first-class matches for Lahore.

In 2017, Asif moved to the UAE with the aim to be selected for the United Arab Emirates cricket team once he became eligible based on his residency in the country.

In March 2022, he was named in the UAE's One Day International (ODI) squad for the 2022 United Arab Emirates Tri-Nation Series tournament, his maiden call-up to the national side. He made his ODI debut on 5 March 2022, for the UAE against Oman.

On 16 March 2023, in a match against Nepal, Khan scored his first century in ODIs. Khan's century came off in 41 balls, which was the quickest hundred by a player from an asssociate nation, and fourth quickest overall, in terms of number of balls played in an ODI.

References

External links
 

1990 births
Living people
Emirati cricketers
United Arab Emirates One Day International cricketers
Pakistani cricketers
Lahore cricketers
Cricketers from Lahore
Pakistani emigrants to the United Arab Emirates
Pakistani expatriate sportspeople in the United Arab Emirates